O.C.F.T.C (Office des Chemins de Fer et des Transports en Commun, French for   Railway and Public Transportation Authority) is the Lebanese government authority which operates public transportation in Lebanon.

The OCFTC currently operates 12 bus lines in and around the capital city of Beirut using a fleet of blue and white colored buses.

There are plans to restore intercity bus service; however, this market is already well served by numerous private bus companies which depart from the Cola area and Charles Helou Station in Beirut to various destinations throughout Lebanon and Syria.

The OCFTC's main competitor is the privately owned and operated Lebanese Commuting Company (LCC) which operates a fleet of red and white colored buses, mostly minibuses. Its service and efficiency is regarded to be better than the OCFTC and thus it charges slightly higher fares.

Due to many problems that have been plaguing the OCFTC, there have been calls to transform it into a regulatory agency with the bus system becoming completely privatized, perhaps transferred entirely to the Lebanese Commuting Company (LCC). These plans may never materialize however.

The OCFTC also owns all of the railway infrastructure in the country, however, as the railway system was severely damaged during Lebanese Civil War, none of the railway system is currently in operation.

There are plans to revive Lebanon's railway system. The French railways, SNCF, have been hired to analyze the railway infrastructure in the country to see what steps should be taken to revive the system. A project to restore the system may still be several years off as it would be extremely costly.

External links
 OCFTC Bus Routes and Schedules

Bus companies of Lebanon
Transport in Lebanon